The 1916 Tennessee gubernatorial election was held on November 7, 1916. Incumbent Democrat Thomas Clarke Rye defeated Republican nominee John W. Overall with 55.04% of the vote.

General election

Candidates
Thomas Clarke Rye, Democratic
John W. Overall, Republican

Results

References

1916
Tennessee
Gubernatorial